The 2021 Nigerian school kidnappings may refer to:

 Kagara kidnapping, a civilian attack resulting in the abduction of 27 schoolchildren and the death of one in Kagara, Niger State, Nigeria
 Zamfara kidnapping, a civilian attack resulting in the abduction of 279 girls in Zamfara, Nigeria
 Kaduna kidnapping (disambiguation)
Afaka kidnapping, at Federal College of Forestry Mechanization in Afaka, Kaduna, Nigeria
Greenfield University kidnapping, Kasarami village, Kaduna State, Nigeria